Mousetrap Heart is the third studio album by Australian rock band Thirsty Merc. It was released on 18 June 2010, through Warner Music Australia. The title track was released as the first single on 21 May 2010. The album marks the band's first release with guitarist Matt Smith, since joining the band just after the departure of Sean Carey earlier in the year.

Singles

"Mousetrap Heart" (21-5-2010)
"Kiss Me Away"
"Tommy and Krista" (3-9-2010)
"All My Life" (released to radio and provided a music video)

Track listing
All songs written by Rai Thistlethwayte.
 "Mousetrap Heart" — 3:33
 "Kiss Me Away" — 3:49
 "All My Life" — 4:38
 "Tommy and Krista" — 3:52
 "DNA" — 3:24
 "Mozambique" — 3:34
 "Betty Page" — 3:38
 "Damn This Love" — 4:28
 "Life Is Life" — 6:30
 "Waiting for You" — 6:06

Personnel
Rai Thistlethwayte – guitars, pianos and singer-songwriter
Phil Stack – bass guitar and backing vocals
Karl Robertson – drums and percussion
Matt Smith – guitar

Charts

References

Thirsty Merc albums
2010 albums